The Wartburg Knights football program is the intercollegiate American football team for Wartburg College located in the U.S. state of Iowa. The team competes in the NCAA Division III and a member of the American Rivers Conference (ARC). Wartburgs first football team was fielded in 1929 with varsity play starting in 1935. The team plays its home games at Walston-Hoover stadium in Waverly, Iowa.

Conference affiliations 
 Iowa Intercollegiate Athletic Conference (1936–2018)
 American Rivers Conference (2018–present)

Playoffs
The Knights have appeared in the Division III Playoffs 15 times, most recently in 2022. They have not had a losing season since 1988. Their combined playoff record is 14–15.

NCAA Division III playoffs

Championships

Conference championships
The Knights have won 18 conference championships

† Co-champions

Current coaching staff
 Head coach: Chris Winter
 Assistant head coach, offensive coordinator, quarterbacks: Matt Wheeler
 Defensive coordinator, linebackers, recruiting coordinator: Matt Tschetter
 Defensive line: Anthony Vela
 Offensive line: Luke Summers
 Wide receivers: Quinton Murphy
 Running backs: Ethan Lape
 Assistant wide receivers: Jeff Beck
 Tight ends: Paul Mugan
 Specialists: Steve Kingery
 Student coach: Jason Splitt

Notable former players
 Bob Nielson
 Matt Entz
 Chris Winter

References

External links

 

 
American football teams established in 1929
1929 establishments in Iowa